Kusimovo (Küsem) is a rural locality (a village) in Tashbulatovsky Selsoviet, Abzelilovsky District, Bashkortostan, Russia. The population was 419 as of 2010. There are 14 streets.

Geography 
Kusimovo is located 43 km north of Askarovo (the district's administrative centre) by road. Zelyonaya Polyana is the nearest rural locality.

References 

Rural localities in Abzelilovsky District